Golestan University of Medical Sciences is a public university in Gorgan, Iran. The University has six faculties including medicine, dentistry, health care, nursing, paramedicine, and Medical Modern Technologies.

Schools
 Medicine (founded in 1991)
 Dentistry  (founded in 1991)
 Health care (founded in 1991)
 Nursing (founded in 1991)
 Paramedicine (founded in 1991)
 Medical Modern Technologies (founded in 1991)

Research Centers
 Cancer Research Center
 Cellular and Molecular Biology Research Center
 Infertility and Reproductive Health Research Center
 Nursing Care Research Center
 Oral Health Research Center

International Journals 
 Jorjani Biomedicine Journal: http://jorjanijournal.goums.ac.ir/
 Journal of Clinical and Basic Research: http://jcbr.goums.ac.ir/
 Journal of Gorgan University of Medical Sciences: http://goums.ac.ir/journal/index.php
 Journal of Research Development in Nursing and Midwifery: http://nmj.goums.ac.ir/
 Medical Laboratory Journal (MLJ): http://mlj.goums.ac.ir/

See also
Higher education in Iran

References

External links
 "Official Website of the Golestan University of Medical Sciences" 

Golestan, University of Medical Sciences
Golestan, University of Medical Sciences
Education in Golestan Province
Buildings and structures in Golestan Province
1991 establishments in Iran